Wilmer is an unincorporated community in Mobile County, Alabama, United States.

History

Wilmer was named in honor of Richard Hooker Wilmer, the second bishop of Alabama in the Episcopal Church. A post office first opened under the name Wilmer in 1894. Wilmer's first mayor was Perry Walter Evans, who also founded Wilmer's fire department. In the 1990's Wilmer gained notoriety for changing the local speed limit on six different occasions in a sort period of time, in large part reportedly as part of a speed trap scheme to raise local revenues.

Demographics

Wilmer was an incorporated community, incorporating around 1970 (though just after the census was taken, as it did not formally appear until the 1980 U.S. Census, with the 1970 population figure when it was still unincorporated). It formally disincorporated effective September 30, 1993.

Geography

Wilmer is located in southwest Alabama northwest of Mobile and near the Alabama-Mississippi border. The community lies on U.S. Route 98 and is two miles northwest of Big Creek Lake.

Education

Mobile County Public School System operates public schools serving the area.

Elementary schools with Wilmer, Alabama addresses include: Wilmer Elementary School (serving the area formerly within the municipality), Turner Elementary School, and Tanner Williams Elementary School, Areas within these boundaries are zoned to Semmes Middle School and Mary G. Montgomery High School.

References

Unincorporated communities in Alabama
Unincorporated communities in Mobile County, Alabama
Populated places disestablished in 1993
Populated coastal places in Alabama
Former municipalities in Alabama